Lifestream can refer to:

 Lifestreaming, "a time-ordered stream of documents that functions as a diary of your electronic life", coined by Eric Freeman and David Gelernter
 Lifestream, a metaphysical concept from the Final Fantasy VII video game franchise, referring to the lifeblood and spirit of the planet